Calliteara arizana is a moth of the family Erebidae first described by Alfred Ernest Wileman in 1910. It is found in Taiwan.

References

Moths described in 1910
Lymantriinae
Moths of Taiwan